Falsenicodes lineatus is a species of beetle in the family Cerambycidae, and the only species in the genus Falsenicodes. It was described by Breuning in 1940.

References

Enicodini
Beetles described in 1940